Selci is a  (municipality) in the Province of Rieti in the Italian region of Latium, located about  north of Rome and about  southwest of Rieti.

Selci borders the following municipalities: Cantalupo in Sabina, Forano, Tarano, Torri in Sabina.

Demographic evolution

References

External links
 selci.comunelazio.net/

Cities and towns in Lazio